The QBZ-191 Automatic Rifle is a Chinese assault rifle chambered for the 5.8×42mm intermediate cartridge, designed and manufactured by Norinco as a new-generation service rifle for the People's Liberation Army (PLA) and People's Armed Police (PAP). The rifle's designation "QBZ" stands for "light weapon (Qīng Wŭqì) - rifle (Bùqiāng) - automatic (Zìdòng)".

The new rifle was formally revealed at the 70th Anniversary National Day military parade on October 1, 2019, carried by troopers of the PLA Ground Force and People's Armed Police.

History

Chinese military initiated the development of conventional layout rifles in 2014, with multiple manufacturers involved in the development and bidding process. Various prototypes of the new weapon platform were leaked online in 2016 and 2017.

The QBZ-191 rifle was designed by Norinco's 208 Research Institute, which also designed the QBZ-95 assault rifle. According to the director of the 208 Research Institute, QBZ-191 is a component of the new "Integrated Soldier Combat System" (单兵综合作战系统), which aims to overhaul the PLA's infantry equipment.

The QBZ-191 was first announced in the 2019 Chinese national parade and would gradually replace the QBZ-95 rifle family in Chinese military service. The QBZ-191 features several improvements, aiming to resolve the unsatisfactory issues, such as ergonomics, of the Type 95 platform.

Design
Compared to the bullpup QBZ-95, the QBZ-191 uses a conventional configuration similar to the QBZ-03, with greatly improved ergonomics, ambidextrous usability, and better reliability across different environments. The platform features various barrel lengths and handguard configurations. A shorter carbine version was carried by vehicle crews during the 2019 parade. 

The QBZ-191 rifle features a full-length Picatinny rail on the top and comes standard with new 3× daylight prismatic optics called QMK152 and QMK-171A, while a thermal sight is also available. The DMR variant is equipped with a new 3–8.6× low power variable zoom sniper scope called QMK-191, and the weapon can also be equipped with the IR5118 digital night vision/thermal scope. The rifle is also equipped with backup iron sights that can be folded down when not in use. The main body is divided into the upper and lower receivers, both are made of aluminium alloy and connected by two assembly pins, while the handguard, pistol grip, and telescoping stock are made of polymer material. The handguard has additional provisions at its 3, 6, and 9 o'clock positions which allow small sections of Picatinny rails to be selectively installed through screw holes, so that various accessories such as flashlight, laser module, foregrip, and bipod can be attached. The reciprocating charging handle is located on the right side, while the bolt-release button sits on the left, above the "rock-and-lock" magazine insertion well. The weapon features a short-stroke piston gas-operation design with rotating bolt.

The rifle has improved ergonomics, featuring a 4-position adjustable buttstock, ambidextrous fire selector, and a lengthened magazine release lever located in front of the trigger guard for speed-reloading or easier manipulation when wearing gloves. The new polymer magazine has a redesigned surface texture for better grip, and a transparent ammunition-checking window. The weapon platform can also be mounted with bayonet and sound suppressor.

According to Chinese media, the QBZ-191 rifle is chambered in the Chinese-proprietary 5.8×42mm caliber with a redesigned DBP-191 ammunition that has better ballistic performance at medium to long ranges. The rifle has been designed into three variants: a standard rifle version with a  barrel, a carbine version with a  barrel called QBZ-192, and a long-barreled designated marksman rifle version called QBU-191. The standard QBZ-191 has a full-auto rate of fire of 750 rounds per minute. The full-auto capability is retained on the QBU-191 designated marksman rifle, which could be easily configured into a light support weapon with a drum magazine.

Variants
QBZ-191 Assault rifle with a  barrel.

QBZ-192 Carbine variant with a  barrel.

QBU-191 Designated marksman rifle with an  effective range, fitted with an accurized long, heavy free-floating barrel, extended handguard, 30-round box magazine and a QMK-191 variable-magnification (3–8.6×) telescopic sight. Selective fire with full-auto mode is retained on the marksman rifle, improving its fire suppression capability.

Users

People's Liberation Army
People's Armed Police

See also
 List of assault rifles

References

5.8 mm firearms
Assault rifles of the People's Republic of China
Weapons and ammunition introduced in 2019
Short stroke piston firearms
Carbines
Light machine guns
Norinco